
AD 24 (XXIV) was a leap year starting on Saturday (link will display the full calendar) of the Julian calendar. At the time, it was known as the Year of the Consulship of Cethegus and Varro (or, less frequently, year 777 Ab urbe condita). The denomination AD 24 for this year has been used since the early medieval period, when the Anno Domini calendar era became the prevalent method in Europe for naming years.

Events

By place

Roman Empire 
 The Roman war against Numidia and Mauretania ends with their annexation.
 Tacfarinas' revolt in Africa is repressed.
 The Senate expels actors from Rome.

Korea 
 King Yuri ascends to the throne as ruler of Silla (Korea).

Africa 
 The Masinissa line of the rulers of Carthage ends.

Deaths 
 Gaius Silius, Roman general and consul
 Lucius Calpurnius Piso, Roman consul
 Namhae, king of Silla
 Strabo, Greek geographer and historian
 Tacfarinas, Numidian military leader
 Wang Lang, Chinese emperor

References 

0024

als:20er#24